The flag of Carillon was flown by the troops of General Louis-Joseph de Montcalm during the Battle of Carillon, which was fought by the French and Canadian forces against those of the British in July 1758 at Fort Carillon.

In 2009, it was displayed at the Musée de l'Amérique française in Quebec City.

Discovery 
In March 1882, Ernest Gagnon wrote that Louis de Gonzague Baillargé (1808–1896), lawyer, businessman, and philanthropist in Quebec, "having read in an old chronicle that a flag from Carillon and suspended in the church of the Recollets in Quebec City had been saved during the fire of the church in 1796," began researching in order to find the flag. In November or December 1847, he met the last of the Récollet priests, Father Louis Marinet dit Bonami (1764–1848), in his residence on Saint-Vallier Street near the Quebec General Hospital.

Towards mid-1848, Baillargé returned to Bonami, who related the history of the flag of Carillon. Baillargé died April 7 of that year from a stroke which occurred in January.

Father Berey (1720–1800), superior of the Récollets, was chaplain to Montcalm's troops. When he returned to the monastery after the campaign of 1758, he brought back with him a flag which was torn and ripped. He mentioned at the convent that it had seen the battle of Carillon. This flag had been suspended from the vault of the Récollet church. On September 6, 1796, a fire which had burnt a house on Saint-Louis Street had also set fire to the convent and church of the Récollets. The conflagration having taken hold in the steeple of the church, the roof burnt before the rest of the church. While one of the brothers was saving a chest filled with objects thrown into it, he crossed the nave of the church, and the old flag fell in front of him. Father Louis took it with him and placed it in the chest with the other objects.

Description 
The banner dates back to the 18th century, confirmed by textile expert Jean-Michel Tuchscherer: "The flag is without doubt an exceptional piece from the 18th century" [Robitaille]. As for the coat of arms under the Madonna now missing, it was most probably that of Charles de la Boische, Marquis de Beauharnois (1671–1749), Governor of New France from 1726 to 1747: Argent, a fess and in chief three martlets sable. Only the governor had the right to inscribe his personal arms on a banner with the arms of France, and only Beauharnois had eagles as supporters. The flag was probably fabricated around 1726, date of the arrival of Beauharnois, and it was known to have been flown on May 29, 1732, for the order of Saint Louis, with its motto .

In 2008, the Canadian Register of Arms, Flags and Badges confirmed the flag's appearance:

See also 

 Coat of arms of Quebec
 Flag of Quebec
 List of Canadian provincial and territorial symbols
 Symbols of Quebec
 Timeline of Quebec history

Notes

References 
 ANQ. "An Act respecting the Flag and emblems of Québec", in CanLII. Federation of Law Societies of Canada, Updated to 1 May 2008
 MRIQ. "Québec flag protocol", in the site of the Ministère des Relations internationales, 2006
 Fraser, Alistair B. "Chapter XV: Quebec", in The Flags of Canada, January 30, 1998

In French 
 BnQ (1973). Bibliographie sur le drapeau du Québec : le fleurdelysé, Bibliothèque nationale du Québec (Centre bibliographique)
 Magnan, Charles-Joseph (1939). Le Carillon-Sacré-Coeur, drapeau national des Canadiens français, Québec : l'Action catholique, 44 pages (edition digitized by the BAnQ)

External links 
 Flag History of Quebec
 Proposals for a flag of Quebec, 1900–1902
 Proposals for a flag of Quebec, 1903–1904: Various versions of the Carillon flag

Canada
National symbols of Canada
Carillon
Provincial symbols of Quebec
Flags of Quebec
New France
History of Quebec